The 1943 Daventry by-election was a parliamentary by-election for the British House of Commons constituency of Daventry, Northamptonshire on 20 April 1943.

Vacancy 

The by-election was caused by the death of the sitting MP and Speaker, Edward FitzRoy on 3 March 1943. He had been MP here since winning the seat as a Conservative when the seat was created in 1918.

Election history 

The result at the last General election was as follows;

Candidates 

The local Conservatives selected 38-year-old Reginald Manningham-Buller.
The Labour party had selected Paul Williams. At the outbreak of war, the Conservative, Liberal and Labour parties had agreed an electoral truce which meant that when a by-election occurred, the party that was defending the seat would not be opposed by an official candidate from the other two parties. When the Labour and Liberal parties joined the Coalition government, it was agreed that any by-election candidate defending a government seat would receive a letter of endorsement jointly signed by all the party leaders.

Dennis Webb was Chairman of the Common Wealth party's Northampton branch. and came forward as a candidate. Liberal party member William Dyer decided to break the electoral truce and stand as an Independent Liberal.

Campaign 

Polling day was set for 20 April 1943, 48 days after the death of Fitzroy, allowing for a long campaign. When nominations closed, it was to reveal a three horse race.

Manningham-Buller received a joint letter of endorsement from all the leaders of the parties in the coalition.

Manningham-Buller addressing a campaign meeting said "Three countries will be pleased if I am defeated - Germany, Italy and Japan."

Result

Aftermath 

Paul Williams, who had been Labour's prospective candidate at the start of the war, ran Manningham-Buller close. Dyer, now standing officially as the Liberal party candidate.
The result at the following General election;

See also 

 List of United Kingdom by-elections
 United Kingdom by-election records

References 

1943 elections in the United Kingdom
By-elections to the Parliament of the United Kingdom in Northamptonshire constituencies
1943 in England
20th century in Northamptonshire